Daubeny may refer to:
 Charles Daubeny (1795–1867), English scientist;
 Charles Daubeny (priest), archdeacon of Salisbury
 Baron Daubeny, a title 
 Henry Daubeny, 1st Earl of Bridgewater